One Night in the Temple is the twelfth album by the American hard rock band Lillian Axe, and their second live album. It was recorded before an audience of 100 friends, family and fans at Sound Landing Studio, a still functioning Masonic Temple where the band had recorded four other albums. Blaze said, "There is a great aura about the place, and we are very comfortable there. In addition to Lillian Axe, I have worked with many other projects there as a guest guitarist and a producer."

The album was released May 27, 2014. It features live performances of their most popular songs intertwined with stories behind the songs. The album also features the original vocalist for Lillian Axe Johnny Vines on the songs "Misery Loves Company" and "Nobody Knows", the latter also including vocals by Brian C. Jones.

The song "Bow Your Head" was inspired by the story of Tripp Roth, a Louisiana toddler born in 2009 who was diagnosed with the rare genetic skin disease junctional epidermolysis bullosa. Blaze was so moved by the boy's story that he wrote the track, which originally appeared on XI: The Days Before Tomorrow. Roth died shortly before the song's release in 2011; his mother was present for the acoustic show recording.

The album was filmed in high definition. The Blu-Ray and DVD contain the acoustic live performance, fan questions and answers, the videos for "Caged In" and "Death Comes Tomorrow", live footage from the July 4, 2013 concert at the Paragon Casino, and behind-the-scenes footage.

Track listing

Personnel
Brian C. Jones – lead vocals
Steve Blaze – lead guitar, backing vocals, keyboards
Sam Poitevent – rhythm guitar, backing vocals, keyboards
Eric Morris – bass guitar
Ken Koudelka – drums

References

2014 live albums
Lillian Axe albums